Halychany the name of the inhabitants of Galicia. It may also refer to:

Halychany, Lviv Oblast, village in Horodok Raion, Lviv Oblast
Halychany, Volyn Oblast, village in Horokhiv Raion, Volyn Oblast